Peter Dalgaard (born 1959) is a Danish statistician and one of the core developers of the R statistical programming language. He is a professor at Copenhagen Business School and was previously a professor of biostatistics at the University of Copenhagen, where he obtained his MSc in 1985 and PhD in 1991.

Selected publications

References

External links 

 

Date of birth missing (living people)
Living people
1959 births
Danish statisticians
R (programming language) people
University of Copenhagen alumni
Academic staff of the University of Copenhagen
Academic staff of Copenhagen Business School